Udo Hahn (born 9 May 1962, Lauf an der Pegnitz) is a German Evangelical Lutheran theologian, pastor and publicist.

References

External links
Books on and by Udo Hahn in the Deutschen Nationalbibliothek

German Protestant theologians
German priests
People from Nürnberger Land
1962 births
Living people